Gaza cubana is a species of sea snail, a marine gastropod mollusk in the family Margaritidae.

Description
The size of the shell varies between 23 mm and 37 mm. The pale beige, discoid shell has a weak but marked spiral sculpture. But the first two whorls of the teleoconch have a purple color. The open umbilicus is only sealed for about 75% by the callus of the inner lip. The apex is preserved. The spire is low and flat.

Distribution
This species occurs in the Caribbean Sea and the Gulf of Mexico at depths between 329 m and 1080 m.

References

 Clench, W. J. and C. G. Aguayo. 1940. Notes and descriptions of new deep-water Mollusca obtained by the Harvard-Habana Expedition off Cuba. III.. Memorias de la Sociedad Cubana de Historia Natural "Felipe Poey" 14: 77–94, pls. 14-16
  Luiz Ricardo L. Simone & Carlo M. Cunha, Revision of genera Gaza and Callogaza (Vetigastropoda, Trochidae), with description of a new Brazilian species; Zootaxa1318: 1–40 (2006)
 Rosenberg, G., F. Moretzsohn, and E. F. García. 2009. Gastropoda (Mollusca) of the Gulf of Mexico, Pp. 579–699 in Felder, D.L. and D.K. Camp (eds.), Gulf of Mexico–Origins, Waters, and Biota. Biodiversity. Texas A&M Press, College Station, Texas

External links
 

cubana
Gastropods described in 1940